Kaler Kantho is one of the most popular Bengali newspapers in Bangladesh. It is an enterprise of East-West Media Group, a sister concern of Bangladesh's leading business conglomerate Bashundhara Group. The same group owns Bangladesh Pratidin, Daily Sun, News24, Radio Capital and Banglanews24.

Abed Khan was the founder editor of Kaler Kantho. The daily was first published on 10 January 2010. After a short span of time Khan resigned as editor (June 2011). After Abed Khan's resignation Imdadul Haq Milan, a popular novelist from Bangladesh became the editor. Shahed Mohammad Ali, former senior news editor of Prothom Alo became the acting editor on 3rd October 2021 after Imdadul Haq Milan had become the director and brand ambassador of East West Media Group.

There are many feature and daily pages in Kaler Kantho, including - Tech Bisshow (IT feature page), Tech Pratidin, Campus, Poralekha (Education daily), Oboshore, A2Z, Dosh dik (Literature), Biggapon biroti, Doctor Achen (Health), Kothay Kothay, Rongey Mela (Entertainment), Ghorar dim (Fun), Mogoj Dholai, and Tin Tin Toon Toon.

See also
 List of newspapers in Bangladesh

References

External links 
 
 Kaler Kantho Epaper

Bengali-language newspapers published in Bangladesh
Daily newspapers published in Bangladesh
Newspapers established in 2010
Newspapers published in Dhaka
2010 establishments in Bangladesh